T Ball can refer to:

Tennis
Tee-ball or T-ball
Tetherball